The Agly is a river in southern France. Its source is in the hills of the Corbières Massif, near Camps-sur-l'Agly. It flows through Saint-Paul-de-Fenouillet, Estagel, Rivesaltes and Saint-Laurent-de-la-Salanque before it flows into the Mediterranean Sea near Le Barcarès.

Tributaries
 Boulzane
 Désix
 Verdouble

References

Rivers of France
Rivers of Aude
Rivers of Pyrénées-Orientales
Rivers of Occitania (administrative region)
0Agly